Cymatoplex is a genus of moths in the family Geometridae.

Species
 Cymatoplex halcyone (Meyrick, 1889)
 Cymatoplex hypolichna Turner, 1910
 Cymatoplex subpellucida Aurivillius, 1920

References
 Cymatoplex at Markku Savela's Lepidoptera and Some Other Life Forms
 Natural History Museum Lepidoptera genus database

Geometrinae